
At , the Hochwanner (formerly: Kothbachspitze) is the second highest mountain in Germany after the Zugspitze (if the somewhat higher Schneefernerkopf is only considered as a sub-peak of the Zugspitze). In addition the Hochwanner is the highest peak on the main ridge of the Wetterstein (Wettersteinhauptkamm) running  from  Gatterl to the  Upper Wettersteinspitze (Oberen Wettersteinspitze) above Mittenwald in an east–west direction. From the Hochwanner massif there is an all-round view of the Rein valley (Reintal), the Leutasch valley in Austria, the Gais valley, the Zugspitze, the Mieming Chain, the Jubiläumsgrat, the Karwendel mountains and far into the central Alps.

Despite being the second highest peak in Germany and having a north face which drops about 1500 m (one of the highest rock faces in the whole of the Northern Limestone Alps) the Hochwanner has remained a relatively unknown mountain. This is due to its relatively inaccessible location, behind the Alpspitze and hidden by the Höllentalspitze. The more widely known, but lower Watzmann is often wrongly cited as the second highest mountain in Germany.

The easiest route to the summit is from the south from the Rotmoosalm (3 hours) or from Gatterl. Pathless in places or only recognisable by a faint trail it initially runs up steep grass meadows, later over a short rock climb (grade I on the UIAA scale) and then mainly over steep, laborious scree slopes to the summit. The route is sparingly marked with cairns. 
The north face is a very long climb.

Hochwanner was first climbed by Hermann von Barth in 1870.

Image gallery

See also
 List of highest mountains of Germany
 Great north faces of the Alps

References

External links
the Hochwanner 

Mountains of the Alps
Mountains of Bavaria
Mountains of Tyrol (state)
Wetterstein
Garmisch-Partenkirchen (district)
Innsbruck-Land District
Two-thousanders of Austria
Two-thousanders of Germany
International mountains of Europe
Austria–Germany border